Zug (also transliterated "Zoug", "Sug"; Arabic: زوك) is located in the far south-east of Western Sahara, 170 km. from Atar, Mauritania. The only erg or sand sea in Western Sahara (known as "Galb Azefal") is located nearby, where it runs from south-west to north-east from Mauritania into Western Sahara and back into Mauritania, where the border forms a right angle. Zug is located in the part of Western Sahara controlled by the Polisario Front and is by them referred to as the Liberated Territories. It is the head of the 1st military region of the Sahrawi Arab Democratic Republic and holds a SPLA military outpost and a small hospital.

Infrastructure 

In June 2009, three friendship associations from Alicante (Spain) had a meeting with Sahrawi ministers, with the intention of building up a hospital in the town. On September, a solidarity concert with Chambao, Oléfunk & Mario Díaz was held in Altea, with the aim to collect money to finance the project. On November, an agreement between POLISARIO representatives and members of the friendship associations to build up the building was signed. In 2011, the construction works had been finished, only lasting the equipment and the medical supplies to open it.

It is the site of a former Spanish Foreign Legion outpost.

Culture 
Near Zug there are some Neolithic engravings with geometrical patterns, similar to others found in Chad and southern Morocco.

Twin towns - Sister cities

  Agullent, Valencia, Valencian Community, Spain (since December 1998)
  Ajangiz, Biscay, Basque Country, Spain
  Campo nell'Elba, Livorno, Tuscany, Italy
  Cantagallo, Prato, Tuscany, Italy (since September 28, 2001)
  Collesalvetti, Livorno, Tuscany, Italy
  Crespina, Pisa, Tuscany, Italy (since October 2007)
  Denia, Alicante, Valencian Community, Spain (since December 1998)
  Lamporecchio, Pistoia, Tuscany, Italy
  Lemoiz, Biscay, Basque Country, Spain
  Maracena, Granada, Andalucía, Spain
  Medina del Campo, Valladolid, Castilla y León, Spain (since August 10, 2008)
  Plentzia, Biscay, Basque Country, Spain
  Reggello, Florence, Tuscany, Italy
  Rosignano Marittimo, Livorno, Tuscany, Italy (since 1993)
  Torrelavega, Cantabria, Spain (since July 17, 2008)
  Valdemoro, Madrid, Spain (since November 20, 2007)
  Zegama, Gipuzkoa, Basque Country, Spain
  Zierbena, Biscay, Basque Country, Spain
  Zumaia, Gipuzkoa, Basque Country, Spain

References

External links
Desert picture of Zug
Spanish territorial police photos on Zug, 1972-1973
Blog about the construction of Zug's hospital

Populated places in Western Sahara
Sahrawi Arab Democratic Republic